Borealis AG is an Austrian chemical company and is the world's eighth largest producer of polyethylene (PE) and polypropylene (PP). It is headquartered in Vienna, Austria.

Overview
Borealis is an international provider of polyolefins, base chemicals, and fertilizers. The company has its head office in Vienna, Austria and currently employs about 6,900 people throughout over 120 countries. In 2020 Borealis generated a net profit of about EUR 589 million. The company operates primarily in Europe, with manufacturing plants in Belgium, Central Europe (Austria and Germany), Finland, and Sweden. It also operates compounding units in Brazil, Italy, and the United States, two "innovation centres", its European Innovation Headquarters, as well as customer service centres in several countries.

At the beginning of 2017, the International Petroleum Investment Company (IPIC) of Abu Dhabi and Mubadala merged. Mubadala, through its holding company, owned 64% of Borealis, with the remaining 36% belonging to Austria-based OMV, an integrated, international oil and gas company. As of autumn 2020 OMV now owns 75% of Borealis, while Mubadala owns 25%.

Borealis provides services and products globally in collaboration with Borouge, a joint venture with the Abu Dhabi National Oil Company (ADNOC)

Innovation 

Borealis employs over 500 people in research and development. There are two research centres in Sweden and Finland, as well as the European Innovation Headquarters in Linz, Austria. In the latter, 300 experts from 30 different nations work on the implementation of new ideas. In 2019 Borealis filed a total of 179 new patent priority applications, which is more than any other Austrian company.

History 
Borealis was founded in 1994 by the merging of the petrochemical interests of Finnish Oil company Neste and the Norwegian oil company Statoil (now renamed Equinor). In 1998 the petrochemicals sector of OMV was included; OMV and IPIC took over the 50% business share of Neste. In 2005 Statoil gave up its share of Borealis and one year later, in June 2006, the headquarters was relocated from Copenhagen to Vienna. Mubadala, through its holding company, owns 64% of the company, with the remaining 36% owned by OMV, an integrated, international oil and gas company.

Products

Polyolefins 
The polyolefin products manufactured by Borealis form the basis of many plastics applications that are an intrinsic part of our daily lives. Borealis polyolefins have a role to play in saving energy along the value chain and promoting more efficient use of natural resources.

Consumer products 
Borealis supplies superior polyolefin plastic materials used in consumer products, advanced packaging and fibre. More specifically, Borealis polyolefins are used to make applications possible in flexible packaging (including blown film, heat seal and extrusion coating), rigid packaging (caps and closures, bottles, thin wall packaging, thermoforming), non-woven and technical fibres, and appliances.

Automotive 
Borealis supplies polyolefin plastic materials for engineering applications in the automotive industry. Plastic materials replace conventional materials such as metal, rubber and engineering polymers. In automotive vehicles, Borealis’ polyolefin plastic materials are used in a wide range of exterior, interior, and under-the-bonnet applications, including bumpers, body panels, trims, dashboards, door claddings, climate control and cooling systems, air intake manifolds and battery cases.

Energy 
The company provides extra-high, high and medium voltage cable applications as well as semi-conductive products that are used for energy transmission and distribution, data and communication cables, and for building and automotive wires and cables.

Pipes and fittings 
Borealis offers pipes used in water and gas supply, waste water and sewage disposal, in-house plumbing and heating, and the oil and gas industry, including multi-layer coatings for onshore and offshore oil and gas pipelines.

New business development 
The company develops products in the areas of healthcare, plastomers and foamable materials.

Base chemicals 
Borealis produces a wide range of base chemicals such as melamine, phenol, acetone, ethylene and propylene for use in numerous and diverse industries, as well as fertilizers and technical nitrogen products.

Hydrocarbons and energy 
Borealis sources basic feedstock such as naphtha, butane, propane and ethane from the international oil and gas markets and converts these into ethylene, propylene and cracker co-products through its hydrocarbon units.

Melamine 
Agrolinz Melamine International (AMI) was consolidated into Borealis in 2007 and renamed Borealis Agrolinz Melamine GmbH. Agrolinz provides melamine (used to treat flooring and furniture for resistance to wear and tear) and fertilizer. Borealis produces melamine at its plants in Linz, Austria, and in Piesteritz, Germany. Gained through conversion from urea, melamine is an essential material for the global production of synthetic resins.

Fertilizers 
Borealis supplies over five million tonnes of fertilizers and technical nitrogen products each year via its Borealis L.A.T distribution network. Borealis L.A.T has 60 warehouses in Europe and an inventory capacity of over 700 kilotonnes. Its distribution network stretches from its headquarters in Linz along the Rhine and Danube, all the way from the Atlantic to the Black Sea. There are subsidiaries all across Europe: Czech Republic, Slovakia, Romania, Hungary, Croatia, Serbia and Bulgaria. In Germany, Italy and France, dedicated L.A.T sales representatives work on site for customers.

Borealis operates fertilizer production plants in Austria, France, the Netherlands and Belgium. In France, Borealis is the largest producer of nitrogen fertilizers with three production facilities in Grand-Quevilly, Grandpuits and Ottmarsheim, as well as a storage site at La Rochelle. Borealis sites are located in important grain-producing regions.

In 2013, Borealis acquired a majority interest in Rosier SA, a mineral fertilizer producer with plants in Belgium and the Netherlands. At present, Borealis has a 77.4% holding in Rosier. With the recently announced world-scale ammonia project in the United States, Borealis continues its ambitious growth strategy in the fertilizer business.

Technology

Borstar proprietary technology 
Borstar is Borealis' proprietary technology for manufacturing polyethylene (PE) and polypropylene (PP).

Joint ventures

Borouge 
Borouge is Borealis’ joint venture with the Abu Dhabi National Oil Company (ADNOC). Its facility is in Ruwais, Abu Dhabi (UAE) and consists of 3 facilities:

Borouge 1 was founded in 2001 and has an ethane-based cracker for production of 600.000 tonnes ethylene per year and two PE lines with a combined capacity of 580.000 tonnes/year and utilises Borealis' Borstar PE technology.

Borouge 2 was a major expansion project complete in 2010 which tripled the annual capacity of polyolefin capacity in Ruwais to 2 million tonnes/year.

Since its completion in 2016 the Borouge 3 plant expansion makes Borouge the world’s largest integrated polyolefins complex. The additional 2.5 million tonnes of polyolefins capacity yield a total Borouge capacity of 4.5 million tonnes, and a combined Borealis and Borouge capacity of 8 million tonnes.

ADNOC and Borealis have moved to the pre-FEED phase for the construction of the Borouge 4 complex, which is slated to come on stream around 2023. Borouge 4 encompasses a mixed feedstock cracker, using existing feedstock available in Abu Dhabi and downstream derivatives units for both polyolefin and non-polyolefin products.

Borealis Brasil 
Borealis Brasil S.A. is a joint-venture between Borealis (80%) and the Brazilian Braskem (20%). Located in Itatiba and Triunfo in Brasil and formed in 1999. It serves the automotive industry in South-America.

Total 
The French oil company Total joined with Canada’s Nova Chemicals and Austria’s Borealis (themselves in a joint venture known as Novealis) to build a $1.7 billion ethylene cracker plus a polyethylene plant, adjacent to Total's Port Arthur refinery in Texas. The cracker, also known as Bay-Pol, will have 1 million metric tons per year of capacity with an ethane cracker feeding two polyethylene units.

Acquisition mtm 
In July 2016, Borealis acquired one of Europe's largest manufacturers of post-consumer polyolefin recyclates  mtm plastics GmbH and mtm compact GmbH.

mtm is able to process PO post-consumer plastic waste (also mixed and inferior) and converts around 70,000 tonnes of this raw material annually into recyclates. mtm uses mixed packaging, bulky household and industrial waste as raw materials.

mtm's recyclates are mainly used in injection moulding and extrusion processes. Typical applications: Containers and transport packaging, household goods, products for the building sector or lawn grids.

Acquisition Ecoplast 
In August 2018 Borealis announced the acquisition of 100% of the shares in Ecoplast Kunststoffrecycling GmbH, an Austrian plastics recycler. Based in Wildon, Austria, Ecoplast processes around 35,000 tonnes of post-consumer plastic waste from households and industrial consumers every year, turning them into LDPE and HDPE recyclates.

Resources

Chemical companies of Austria
Manufacturing companies based in Vienna
Austrian brands